The 1874–75 FA Cup was the fourth season of England's oldest football tournament, the Football Association Challenge Cup or "FA Cup". 29 teams entered, one more than the previous season, although four of the 29 never played a match. The final was contested by Royal Engineers – playing in their third final in the four seasons of the FA Cup – and Old Etonians – playing in their first final. On their way to the final, Royal Engineers knocked out Cambridge University in the Second Round and holders Oxford University in the Semi-finals, while Old Etonians only managed to score more than one goal in one match: their second replay against Swifts, which they won 3–0. The biggest win of the competition was recorded by two-time FA Cup winners Wanderers, who beat Farningham 16–0 in the First Round.

In the final, played on 13 March 1875, Old Etonians forced a replay against Royal Engineers, with the two sides playing out a 1–1 draw. The replay was played three days later, when two goals from Henry Renny-Tailyour secured a 2–0 win for Royal Engineers.

Format

First Round: 28 teams (with Reigate Priory F.C. getting a bye) would face another team, eliminating the losers

Second Round: The 14 First Round teams and Reigate Priory would play against an opponent, with Old Etonians getting a bye

Third Round - Finals: The remaining teams would play in a knockout-round style, due to the teams being a power of two. In the finals, Old Etonians lost in a replay to Royal Engineers

First round
All 29 teams entered the competition at the First Round stage. However, due to the odd number of entrants, Reigate Priory were given a bye to the Second Round. Three teams – Civil Service, Windsor Home Park and Shropshire Wanderers – were also awarded walkovers. Three of the ties finished as draws and went to replays; of these, one had to be decided by a second replay. The biggest win in the competition came at this stage with Wanderers' 16–0 win over Farningham.

Replays

Second round
The 15 teams that progressed from the First Round took part in the Second Round. Due to the odd number of teams, Old Etonians were given a bye to the Third Round. Oxford University were awarded a walkover in their tie against Windsor Home Park. In all but one of the fixtures, the losing teams failed to score. Two matches saw the biggest win of the round: both Royal Engineers and Wanderers beat their respective opponents 5–0. The Civil Service scratched from its replay against the Shropshire Wanderers as its members could not, or would not, travel to Shrewsbury for the replay.

Replay

Third round
The eight teams that progressed from the Second Round took part in the Third Round. There was no need for any team to be given a bye to the next round, and there were no walkovers. Only one tie required a replay, in which Shropshire Wanderers recorded the biggest win of the round: a 2–0 win over Woodford Wells.

Replay

Semi-finals
The four winning teams from the Third Round took part in the Semi-finals. Old Etonians beat Shropshire Wanderers at the first attempt, but Royal Engineers required a replay to beat Oxford University after a 1–1 draw; they won the replay 1–0. All three matches were played at Kennington Oval, London.

Replay

Final
The 1875 FA Cup Final was played on 13 March 1875 between Royal Engineers and Old Etonians at Kennington Oval in London. The match was refereed by cup founder C. W. Alcock of Wanderers F.C. It finished as a 1–1 draw, with goals from Henry Renny-Tailyour for Royal Engineers and Alexander Bonsor for Old Etonians, which meant that there would have to be a replay.

Replay
The replay was played three days later, also at Kennington Oval and refereed by C. W. Alcock. Two goals from Henry Renny-Tailyour  gave Royal Engineers a 2–0 win and their first FA Cup title in three attempts.

References

 FA Cup Results Archive

1874-75
1874–75 in English football
FA Cup